Aktal (Ak-Tal) is a rural locality (a selo) in Kazakhskoye Rural Settlement of Kosh-Agachsky District, the Altai Republic, Russia. The population was 3 as of 2016.

Geography 
Aktal is located 20 km southeast of Kosh-Agach (the district's administrative centre) by road. Kokorya is the nearest rural locality.

References 

Rural localities in Kosh-Agachsky District